Serena (born February 20, 1951) is an American former pornographic actress.
She was married to porn actor Jamie Gillis.

A teenage runaway, Serena was discovered by a make-up artist. She began by modelling for men's magazines, then moved on to film. She starred in over 110 pornographic films between 1975 and 1988, including Sweet Cakes (1976), Fantasm (1976), Fantasm Comes Again (1977), Sensual Encounters of Every Kind (1978), Honky Tonk Nights (1978), Dracula Sucks (aka Lust At First Bite) (1978), Summertime Blue (1979), Pleasure Palace (1979), Small Town Girls (1979) and Insatiable (1980).

Playboy magazine published an interview with Serena in 1978, together with other "top adult performers". In 1976, she appeared in the film Body of My Enemy, as Frida de Düsseldorf, an amazing stripper. In 1979, she appeared in the film Hardcore in an uncredited role. She has dated Warren Beatty. She was last reported to be living in the San Francisco Bay Area working as an artist. She's a painter and a writer.

Serena was inducted into the XRCO Hall of Fame as a "film pioneer".

Additional references 
Interviews
Hustler (USA) July 1983, by: Jamie Gillis & Lisa DeLeeuw, "Are Porn Stars Really Good in Bed?" 
High Society (USA) March 1983, "What Ever Happened to Serena?" 
Adult Cinema Review (USA) January 1983, Vol. 2, Iss. 7, pg. 38+40+42+44-46+48+86-88, by: Sindi Sorrell, "Serena's Scrapbook: Staying *Saucy in Sausalito--The retired Queen of Kink regales our editor with lustful tales of yore."

Articles
Metasex (USA) 2001, Vol. 1, Iss. 4, pg. 54–55, by: Michelle Clifford, "The Dynamic Duo, Serena and Jamie Gillis" 
Cinema-X Review (USA) March 1981, Vol. 2, Iss. 3, pg. 24–26, by: Serena, "Serena Shares Serena"

Pictorial
High Society (USA) March 1991, "Porn Star Hall of Fame" 
High Society (USA) May 1986 
The Very Best of High Society (USA) 1986, Vol. 1, Iss. 4, pg. 81–86, "Serena: Brush Strokes" 
Eros Sex Stars (USA) February 1985, Vol. 1, Iss. 5, pg. 23–29, by: The POM Agency, "Her Highness Serena" 
Mr. February (USA) February 1984 
Expose! (USA) September 1983, Vol. 3, Iss. 7, pg. 46–53, by: n/a, "Serena" 
Erotic Film Guide (USA) July 1983, Vol. 1, Iss. 7, pg. 20–25, by: Sneed Hearn, "Serena & Jamie: together again" 
Eros (USA) May 1983 
High Society (USA) April 1983, by: Bruce Kennedy 
Mr. April (USA) April 1983 
High Society (USA) March 1983, by: Don Lau, "What Ever Happened to Serena?" 
Adult Cinema Review (USA) January 1983, Vol. 2, Iss. 7, pg. 38–51, "Serena's Scrapbook: Staying Saucy in Sausalito..." 
Harvey (USA) December 1981 
Velvet Talks (USA) August 1981 
Eros (USA) May 1981 
Playboy (USA) November 1980, Vol. 27, Iss. 11, pg. 180, by: Arthur Knight, "Sex In Cinema 1980" 
Club (USA) August 1980, by: Serge Jacques 
Cinema-X Review (USA) April 1980, Vol. 1, Iss. 4, pg. 49–53, by: Ted Snyder, "Serena" 
Playboy (USA) November 1979, Vol. 26, Iss. 11, pg. 180, by: Arthur Knight, "Sex In Cinema 1979" 
Playboy (USA) December 1978, Vol. 25, Iss. 12, pg. 245, by: Jim Harwood, "Sex Stars Of 1978" 
Mr. November (USA) November 1978 
Playboy (USA) July 1977, Vol. 24, Iss. 7, pg. 136, "The New Girls Of Porn" 
Pix (USA) June 1975, Vol. 1, Iss. 6

Magazine cover photo
Erotic Film Guide (USA) July 1983, Vol. 1, Iss. 7 
Eros (USA) May 1983 
Cinema-X Review (USA) April 1980, Vol. 1, Iss. 4 
Pix (USA) June 1975, Vol. 1, Iss. 6
Beaver Fever (USA) 1975

References

External links

 
 
 

American pornographic film actresses
American female adult models
1951 births
Living people
20th-century American actresses
21st-century American women